Seymour High School is a public high school located in Seymour, Texas, United States and classified as a 2A school by the University Interscholastic League (UIL). It is part of the Seymour Independent School District located in central Baylor County. In 2015, the school was rated "Met Standard" by the Texas Education Agency.

Academics
UIL Computer Science Champions - 
2000(2A), 2002(2A)

Athletics
The Seymour Panthers compete in these sports - 

Baseball
Basketball
Cross Country
Football
Golf
Powerlifting
Softball
Tennis
Track and Field

Notable alumni
 Bobby Plummer, football head coach
 George Sims, former NFL player

References

External links
Seymour ISD

Public high schools in Texas